State Route 361 (SR 361, OH 361) is a  long state highway entirely located within Pickaway Township, Pickaway County, Ohio. The route connects US 23 with SR 159 just north of Kingston.

Route description
The state highway begins at an unsignalized intersection with the divided US 23 in Pickaway Township. The two-lane road travels east through farmland though there are two S-curves that bring the route further south. In the unincorporated community of Elmwood, the road passes over a railroad via a bridge.

History
By 1934, the route received its number of SR 361. The route was extended to its current length between US 23 and SR 159 circa 1937. By 1948, the route was fully paved and has not changed since its first designation.

Major intersections

References

361
Transportation in Pickaway County, Ohio